Cricket ACT is the governing body of cricket in the Australian Capital Territory (ACT). In 1922, the Federal Territory Cricket Association (FTCA) was established to govern the sport of cricket in the then Federal Capital Territory, which had been formed from part of New South Wales in 1911, and which became the Australian Capital Territory in 1938. In 1928, the FTCA was renamed as the Federal Capital Territory Cricket Association.

References

External links

Cricket governing bodies in Australia
Sports governing bodies in the Australian Capital Territory
1922 establishments in Australia
Sports organizations established in 1922